Lebedinsky or Lebedinski is a surname. Notable persons with the surname include:

 Iaroslav Lebedynsky (born 1960), French historical writer
 Lev Lebedinsky (1904–1992), Soviet musicologist
 Mikołaj Lebedyński (born 1990), Polish soccer player
 Vyacheslav Lebedinsky (1888–1956), Soviet chemist